Conophytum flavum, the yellow cone plant, is a small South African species of succulent flowering plant of the family Aizoaceae.

Description
This species has rounded, flattened (truncated) bodies, covered with many idioblasts. Its flowers, which appear in autumn and winter, are unscented and yellow (flavum is Latin for “golden”).

Distribution and habitat
It is indigenous to the arid winter-rainfall Namaqualand region, in the far west of South Africa. Here it grows in rocky outcrops and crevices.

In cultivation in the UK this plant has gained the Royal Horticultural Society’s Award of Garden Merit. (confirmed 2017).

References

Further reading
Hammer,S.(2002) Dumpling and his wife: New views of the genus Conophytum EAE Creative Colour Ltd. .
Hammer,S.(1993) The genus Conophytum : A Conograph Succulent Plant Publications, Pretoria. .
National Botanical Institute of South Africa.(1993) List of Southern African Succulent Plants Umdaus Press.

External links

flavum
Endemic flora of South Africa
Flora of the Cape Provinces
Namaqualand
Taxa named by N. E. Brown